Pistol grip may refer to:

 Pistol grip, a handle for a firearm, drill, or other tool
 Pistol grip (fencing), a grip used for foil and épée swords in the sport of fencing
 Pistol Grip, a street punk band
 "Pistol Grip Pump", a 1994 hip hop song by Volume 10, famously covered by Rage Against the Machine